Mike Shaver (born February 17, 1977) is a former Engineering Director at Facebook. He is also known for his work on several open source projects. He has been involved in the development of many of the technologies that enable interactive web pages, such as the JavaScript language.

Background 
Shaver attended high school at Lisgar Collegiate Institute in Ottawa, where he began working with Ingenia Communications Corporation, an Ottawa-area computer consultancy that later dissolved. His efforts saw him rise from a summer student who worked as a system administrator and software developer to chief systems architect and eventually Chief technical officer (CTO).

Career 
Shaver eventually left to work at Netscape Communications and later zerøknowledge, Cluster File Systems, and the Oracle Corporation. Beginning as a visiting developer, he quickly rose through the ranks and eventually gained Internet fame by becoming a founding member of the Mozilla Organization in 1998.

He served as VP of Engineering and VP of Technical Strategy for the Mozilla Corporation where he helped people understand, build, and benefit from an open Web. He became associated within the discussions of web standardization and also performed gatekeeper role. At Mozilla, Shaver worked with Mike Schroepfer, who also later began working at Facebook.

Shaver was also at the center of the "ten fucking days" imbroglio wherein he wrote on his business card "ten fucking days" referencing a recent ten-day turnaround for a security flaw from notification to releasing a fixed version of Firefox. His intent was to show confidence in Mozilla's ability to quickly address security issues, but it was misunderstood as a general or official Mozilla policy. Shaver stayed at Mozilla for six years before he transferred to Facebook, where he became the director of engineering from 2011 to 2016.

In 2016, Shaver returned to Canada and joined Real Ventures. His first investment was the startup called integrate.ai, where he also serves as CTO.

In 2022, Shaver began working for Shopify as a Distinguished Engineer.

References

External links 
 Mike Shaver's Weblog, noise from signal
 Shaverman webcomic, (pg1 | pg2)

1977 births
Living people
Mozilla developers
Open source people
People from Grande Prairie
Lisgar Collegiate Institute alumni